Orlando Bailey (born 30 September 2001) is an English professional rugby union player who plays for Bath in the Gallagher Premiership.

Club career
Bailey started to play rugby as a child at Dorchester RFC before joining the Bath academy at the age of fourteen. In September 2020 he made his club debut for Bath in a league game against Worcester Warriors.

International career
In 2019 Bailey represented the England  under-18 team. He was a member of the England under-20 squad that completed a grand slam during the 2021 Six Nations Under 20s Championship.

In January 2022 Bailey received his first call-up to the senior England squad by coach Eddie Jones for the 2022 Six Nations Championship however he subsequently withdrew due to suffering a hamstring injury during training.

On the 19th of June 2022 Bailey made his senior England debut in a 52-21 defeat against the Barbarians at Twickenham, coming on for Bath teammate Joe Cokanasiga in the 66th minute.

References

External links
Bath Profile
ESPN Profile
Ultimate Rugby Profile

2001 births
Living people
Bath Rugby players
English rugby union players
People educated at Beechen Cliff School
Rugby union players from Dorchester, Dorset
Rugby union fly-halves
Rugby union fullbacks